

All Scorers 
The table below contains the all-time top Iran League goal scorers.  The list shows Top goal scorers in Iran Pro League since its foundation on 2 November 2001.

Reza Enayati has scored 147 goals and is in top of most goals in Persian gulf pro league.

See also
Season by season IPL top goal scorers
Top-division league all-time top goal scorers

External links
Iran Pro League 2017-18 Top Scorers
Azadegan League 2017-18 Top Scorers
Iran Div 2 League 2017-18 Top Scorers
All-time top IPL scorers

All
Association football player non-biographical articles
Iran